Jin Jingdao (born 18 November 1992) is a Chinese professional footballer of Korean ethnicity who currently plays as a midfielder for Chinese Super League club Shandong Taishan.

Club career
Jin Jingdao started his football career with Yanbian FC in 2010. He made his debut for the club on 17 April 2010 in a 1–0 win against Guangdong Sunray Cave. He scored his first goal for the club on 15 May 2010 in a 2–1 win against Pudong Zobon. Jin transferred to China League One side Shenyang Shenbei for a fee of ¥2.3 million in January 2012.

On 27 February 2013, Jin transferred to Chinese Super League side Shandong Luneng (now renamed Shandong Taishan). He made his debut for the club on 16 March 2013 in a 2–0 win against Changchun Yatai. He made 18 appearances in his debut season for Shandong and won the Chinese Football Association Young Player of the Year award. The following season he would continued to be a vital member of the team and went on to win his first piece of silverware by winning the 2014 Chinese FA Cup with them.

On 8 September 2016, Jin was suspended temporarily for 60 days by the Asian Football Confederation after testing positive for the banned substance Clenbuterol in a 2016 AFC Champions League match against FC Seoul. On 4 November 2016, he received a final ban of eight months, which was reduced to three months until 8 December 2016. 

On his return, Jin would immediately establish himself back into the team and scored his first goal in the Chinese Super League in a 2–0 win against Tianjin Teda on 9 July 2017. A consistent regular within the team, he would gain his second Chinese FA Cup by winning the 2020 Chinese FA Cup against Jiangsu Suning F.C. in a 2-0 victory. This would be followed by his first league title with the club when he was part of the team that won the 2021 Chinese Super League title. Another Chinese FA Cup would be followed up by him winning the 2022 Chinese FA Cup with them.

International career
Jin was called up to the Chinese under-20 national team in June 2009 and was promoted to captain by then manager Su Maozhen. He also played several matches during the 2010 AFC U-19 Championship. He made his debut for the Chinese national team on 26 March 2011 in a 2–2 draw against Costa Rica. On 30 May 2021, Jin scored his first international goal in a 7-0 win over Guam in the 2022 FIFA World Cup qualification.

Career statistics

Club statistics
.

International statistics

Scores and results list China's goal tally first.

Honours

Club
Shandong Luneng/ Shandong Taishan
Chinese Super League: 2021.
Chinese FA Cup: 2014, 2020, 2021, 2022.
Chinese FA Super Cup: 2015.

Individual
Chinese Football Association Young Player of the Year: 2013
Chinese Super League Team of the Year: 2018

References

External links
 
 

Living people
1992 births
People from Yanbian
Chinese footballers
Footballers from Jilin
Chinese people of Korean descent
China youth international footballers
China international footballers
Yanbian Funde F.C. players
Shandong Taishan F.C. players
Chinese Super League players
China League One players
Chinese sportspeople in doping cases
Association football midfielders
2019 AFC Asian Cup players